Saudi Arabia–Spain relations are the bilateral and diplomatic relations between these two countries. Saudi Arabia has an embassy in Madrid and a consulate general in Málaga. Spain has an embassy in Riyadh.

Diplomatic relations 
The relations between the two have been traditionally characterized by being cordial, marked by a traditional sympathy and friendship between the two royal houses. The king of Spain is the main asset of Spain's relations with this country. Proof of this was the
preferential treatment given to Juan Carlos I in Saudi Arabia during his last official visits in 2006 and 2008. To the above, we must add the sympathy and interest that the Saudis show for the Arab past of Spain, very present in the collective imagination and remembered in the form of names
alluding to this past in numerous streets, buildings and establishments of all kinds in this country. Saudi Arabia's support for Spain during
the celebration of the World Cup also showed the good perception that this country has of Spanish society.

It is also worth highlighting the importance of Saudi tourism in Spain, as a vehicle for rapprochement between the two societies. This is a quality tourism, with high-income people who have followed the example of King Fahd and other members of the Royal Family such as Prince Salman, Governor of Riyadh. On the occasion of the aforementioned royal visit (April 2006) an agreement was signed to institutionalize political contacts.

Economic relations 
Spain broke a record in arms sales to Saudi Arabia the year the Yemen war broke out. Official data shows that 2015, the year in which the controversial sale of 400 bombs that will finally be delivered to Riyadh was also signed, registered much more juicy operations with the Saudi monarchy. Exports to that country accounted for 14% of the total and practically doubled (grew 86%) the 2014 figures. Although Spanish companies allocate their production mainly to EU and NATO states, sales to the State of the peninsula Arabic and others of doubtful reputation in human rights have skyrocketed in recent years.

The economic relations between Saudi Arabia and Spain have known a greater deepening in recent times although they are still far from their potential, according to the Ministry of Foreign Affairs and Cooperation of Spain. Proof of this is that registered direct investment flows remain very small in both directions.

However, the recent award of the High Speed Mecca - Jeddah - Medina project to the Hispanic-Saudi consortium Al Shoula Group,
participated by a series of public and private Spanish companies such as RENFE, ADIF, TALGO, OHL, COPASA, COBRA, CONSULTRANS, IMATHIA, INABENSA and GINOVART, DI- METRONIC and INDRA, in October 2011, amounting to 7,000 million euros, constitute a milestone in these relationships and an opportunity to demonstrate the good work of Spanish companies in the infrastructure sector.

The contract, signed in Riyadh, in January 2012, involves the design, construction, operation and maintenance of the line and trains
over a period of twelve years. The line will be 450 km long and will serve more than 160,000 pilgrims a day.

Good economic relations between the two countries, in particular the sale of weapons, has generated criticism due to the extremely conservative nature of Saudi Arabia and its involvement in wars in countries of the Arab environment such as Yemeni Civil War.

See also  
 Foreign relations of Saudi Arabia 
 Foreign relations of Spain

References 

 
Spain
Saudi Arabia